Vogel may refer to:

Places
Vogel (lunar crater)
Vogel (Martian crater)
11762 Vogel, a main-belt asteroid
Vogel (mountain), a mountain of Slovenia
Vogel Ski Resort
Vogel State Park, Georgia, United States
Vogel Glacier, a glacier of Antarctica
Vogel Peak, a mountain of South Georgia

Other uses
Vogel (surname)
Vogel, the main character in the 1959 novel The Last Valley by J.B. Pick
Vogel's, a brand of bread sold by Quality Bakers in New Zealand

See also

VOGL, debugging software